

Portugal
 Angola – Francisco Antonio Gonçalves Cardoso, Governor-General of Angola (1865–1868)

United Kingdom
 Gibraltar – Richard Airey, Governor of Gibraltar (1865–1870)
Malta Colony – Henry Knight Storks, Governor of Malta (1864–1867)
New South Wales – John Young, Baron Lisgar, Governor of New South Wales (1861–1867)
 Queensland – Sir George Bowen, Governor of Queensland (1859–1868)
 Tasmania – Colonel Thomas Browne, Governor of Tasmania (1862–1868)
 South Australia – Sir Dominick Daly, Governor of South Australia (1862–1868)
 Victoria 
 Sir Charles Darling, Governor of Victoria (1863–1866)
 John Manners-Sutton, Lord Canterbury, Governor of Victoria (1866–1873)
 Western Australia – John Hampton, Governor of Western Australia (1862–1868)

Colonial governors
Colonial governors
1866